Remix 2014 EP is the fourth extended play (EP) by American industrial rock band by Nine Inch Nails. It was released on January 21, 2014, exclusively on Beats Music, a streaming service project led by Trent Reznor and Dr. Dre. Trent Reznor acts as the chief creative officer of the website.

The EP features remixes of four songs from the band's 2013 album, Hesitation Marks. These songs include "Satellite", "Running", "Copy of a" and "Everything", which are remixed by Hot Chip, Cold Cave, Simian Mobile Disco, and Autolux, respectively.

Track listing

Personnel
Nine Inch Nails
Trent Reznor

Remixers
Hot Chip
Cold Cave
Simian Mobile Disco
Autolux

References

External links
 
 Remix 2014 EP on Beats Music

2014 EPs
2014 remix albums
Albums produced by Trent Reznor
Columbia Records EPs
Columbia Records remix albums
Nine Inch Nails EPs
Nine Inch Nails remix albums
Remix EPs